Cnemolia douceti is a species of beetle in the family Cerambycidae. It was described by Lepesme and Breuning in 1955.

It can be found on the Ivory Coast.

References

Endemic fauna of Ivory Coast
Ancylonotini
Beetles described in 1955